Coleophora anelpista is a moth of the family Coleophoridae.

The larvae feed on Phlomis species. They feed on the leaves of their host plant.

References

anelpista
Moths described in 1994